The 1966 Massachusetts gubernatorial election was held on November 8, 1966. Governor John A. Volpe was reelected to a four-year term. He defeated former Attorney General Edward J. McCormack Jr. in the general election. This was the first election held since Governor's term of office was extended from two to four years.

Republican primary

Candidates
 John Volpe, incumbent Governor

Results
Governor Volpe was unopposed for renomination.

Democratic primary

Candidates
 Edward J. McCormack Jr., former Massachusetts Attorney General
 Kenneth O'Donnell, former aide to President Kennedy

Results

General election

Results
Volpe defeated McCormack by over a half million votes. He won the majority of the votes in every Massachusetts county. This was the last general election in which the Governor and Lt. Governor were elected separately.

See also
1966 Massachusetts general election
 1965–1966 Massachusetts legislature

References

 
Massachusetts
Massachusetts gubernatorial elections
November 1966 events in the United States